László Magyar (born 30 March 1936) is a retired Hungarian backstroke swimmer who won two silver medals at the European Championships of 1954 and 1958. He competed in the 100 m backstroke at the 1956 Summer Olympics, but did not reach the finals.

References

External links
 
 

1936 births
Living people
Swimmers at the 1956 Summer Olympics
Olympic swimmers of Hungary
Hungarian male swimmers
European Aquatics Championships medalists in swimming
Male backstroke swimmers